The Mansouri oil field is an oil field located in southwest Iran and 45km southeast of Ahvaz city. It was discovered in 1963 and the production was started after installing production facilities in 1974. Its oil reserves have been estimated at 3.3 bn barrels. The field is owned by state-owned National Iranian Oil Company (NIOC) and operated by National Iranian South Oil Company (NISOC).

See also

List of oil fields

References

Oil fields of Iran